John Glenn (born July 10, 1928) is a former Major League Baseball outfielder. He was born in Moultrie, Georgia.

Sources

1928 births
Living people
Major League Baseball outfielders
St. Louis Cardinals players
Abingdon Triplets players
African-American baseball players
Atlanta Crackers players
Hazleton Dodgers players
Hornell Dodgers players
Lancaster Red Roses players
Leaksville-Draper-Spray Triplets players
Macon Dodgers players
Newport News Dodgers players
Pueblo Dodgers players
Radford Rockets players
Rochester Red Wings players
San Juan Marlins players
Charleston Marlins players
St. Paul Saints (AA) players
Syracuse Chiefs players
Tacoma Giants players
Trois-Rivières Royals players
Wytheville Pioneers players
Baseball players from Georgia (U.S. state)
People from Moultrie, Georgia
Salt Lake City Bees players
21st-century African-American people
20th-century African-American sportspeople